Uvularia perfoliata, the perfoliate bellwort, is a perennial forb native to the eastern United States and Canada, which produces pale yellow flowers in spring.

Description

The smooth slender stem of Uvularia perfoliata is 15 to 50 centimeters tall, and forked above the middle. The leaves are obovate, 4 to 12 centimeters long and 1.5 to 4 centimeters wide, glabrous or glaucous, and perfoliate. There are usually 1 to 4 leaves below the fork in the stem. The stems bear a single downward drooping flower with six 2 to 3.5 centimeter long tepals which are granular on the inside. The fruit is a triangular three lobed capsule 7 to 13 millimeters in length.

Distribution and habitat
Uvularia perfoliata is widely distributed in the eastern and southern United States from Texas to New Hampshire, plus the Canadian province of Ontario. It is listed as an endangered species by the states of Indiana and New Hampshire. In Virginia, it grows in habitats such as floodplain forests, but also mesic upland forests, and dry rocky woodlands. The presence of this species is dependent on appropriate habitat, and it may be eliminated from an area by development, changes in land use, or competition with invasive species.

Taxonomy
This species is a member of the genus Uvularia, which was formerly placed in the family Liliaceae, but has more recently been placed in the family Colchicaceae, in keeping with the findings of the Angiosperm Phylogeny Group.

References

perfoliata
Flora of the Northeastern United States
Flora of the Southeastern United States
Flora of Eastern Canada
Flora of the Appalachian Mountains
Flora of the Great Lakes region (North America)
Plants described in 1753
Taxa named by Carl Linnaeus
Flora without expected TNC conservation status